Physetica phricias is a moth of the family Noctuidae. It is endemic to New Zealand. It is wide spread in the South Island and inhabits shrubland. The host of the larvae of this species is matagouri. The adult moths are on the wing from September to May and July, and are attracted both to light and sugar traps.They are a faster-flying species and remain active even during windy conditions. P. phricias can be confused with some forms of P. sequens. However P. phricias can be distinguished as it has a less marbled appearance to its forewing.

Taxonomy 

This species was first named by Edward Meyrick as Mamestra phricias in 1888. George Hudson described and illustrated this species both in his 1898 book New Zealand moths and butterflies (Macro-lepidoptera) and in his 1928 book The butterflies and moths of New Zealand using the name Melanchra phricias. In 1905 George Hampston placed this species within the genus Morrisonia. In 1911 William Warren believing he was describing a new species named it Cucullia cellulata. In 1988 J. S. Dugdale discussed the species under the name Graphania phricias. 

In 2017 Robert J. B. Hoare undertook a revision of New Zealand Noctuinae and placed this species within the Physetica genus. As such this species is currently known as Physetica phricias. At the same time Hoare synonymised Cucullia cellulata into that name.

The lectotype specimen is held at the Natural History Museum, London. The lectotype was collected by R. W. Fereday in Christchurch.

Description 

The larvae of this species are up to 33mm in length and are grey coloured with the dorsal having a pink shade. The larvae have a black and white sub-dorsal line as well as a broad whiteish lateral band.  

Hudson described the adult moth of the species as follows: 
 

P. phricias can be confused with some forms of P. sequens. However P. phricias can be distinguished as it has a less marbled appearance to its forewing.

Distribution 
This species endemic to New Zealand. It is widespread in the South Island. Hoare pointed out that although both Hudson and E. G. White stated that specimens had been collected in the central and southern North island, he could not find specimens in any collection to confirm this.

Behaviour and biology 
The adult moths are on the wing from September to May with some specimens also collected in July. Adult moths are attracted to sugar and light. They have been trapped using Robinson light traps. They are a faster-flying species and remain active even during windy conditions.

Habitat and host species 

The preferred habitat of P. phricias is scrubland. The host of the larvae of this species is Discaria toumatou.

Conservation status
P. phricias is currently not regarded as threatened.

References

External links

Image of lectotype specimen
Image of larva of the species

Moths described in 1888
Hadeninae
Moths of New Zealand
Endemic fauna of New Zealand
Taxa named by Edward Meyrick
Endemic moths of New Zealand